James Stanley is an American TV writer, producer and actor. He has also been credited as James Carl Stanley and Jim Stanley. He is married to Diane Messina Stanley, who is also a writer.

Positions held
The Young and the Restless (October 2006 - December 22, 2007; April 4, 2008 - January 2009: Breakdown Writer)
Knots Landing (October 1988 - May 1990: Head Writer. 1985-1988 script writer)
Strong Medicine
Judging Amy
That's Life (hired by Diane Ruggiero)
Pacific Palisades
Savannah
Early Edition
Homefront
Second Chances
Hotel Malibu (Producer)
Road to Avonlea (Executive Consultant)
Here's Boomer
Magnum, P.I.
The Girl From Monday
Dragon Ball Z

External links 

American soap opera writers
Soap opera producers
Place of birth missing (living people)
Year of birth missing (living people)
American male television writers
American television producers
Living people
American male writers
American male screenwriters